TCJ may refer to:
Eiken (studio)
The Comics Journal
TCJ subsection at Cell junction
Tube CAD Journal (Online Publication)
Tree Climbing Japan (Outdoor activity)